James Painter Davis (11 February 1790 – 9 October 1870) was an English cricketer active in the 1820s and 1830s, making four appearances in first-class cricket. Christened at Bethnal Green, Middlesex on 7 March 1790, Davis was a batsman of unknown style who played first-class cricket for three teams.

Career
Davis made his first-class debut for Kent against the Marylebone Cricket Club (MCC) in 1828 at Lord's. Four years later he made two first-class appearances for the Gentlemen of Kent against the MCC and the Gentlemen of England, before making a final first-class appearance for an early England team against Sussex in 1834. In his four appearances in first-class cricket, Davis scored 46 runs at an average of 5.75, with a high score of 13.

He died at Peckham, Surrey on 9 October 1870, aged 80.

References

External links

1790 births
1870 deaths
People from Bethnal Green
English cricketers
Kent cricketers
Gentlemen of Kent cricketers
Non-international England cricketers